Banalata may refer to:

 Banalata Sen- Bengali poem written in 1942
 Banalata Sen (book)- book by Jibanananda Das